The Zamboanga City Special Economic Zone (or ZamboEcoZone), otherwise known by its corporate name as Zamboanga Freeport Authority (ZFA), is a special economic zone located in Zamboanga City in the province of Zamboanga del Sur in Mindanao, Philippines. It is the only economic zone located in Western Mindanao.

The Zamboanga Freeport Authority was conceptualized to be an economic hub that is designed to generate local economic activities that will serve as a springboard for the promotion of trade, investments, and ecology tourism not only in Zamboanga City but also throughout the region.

By nature of its operation, Zamboanga Freeport Authority is unique being both an economic zone and free port and is the only free port in Mindanao.

ZAMBOECOZONE is a self-contained multiple layered economic free port zone offering 100% foreign business ownership with fiscal and non-fiscal incentives for investors who wish to locate in this trade centre in the east of Asia. Cumulative committed investments in 2015 reached Php 23.6 billion  with prospective 1,301 jobs generated from existing French, Japanese, Korean and Filipino locators.

History

The Zamboecozone was created by virtue of Republic Act 7903  authored by former Congresswoman Maria Clara L. Lobregat. It was enacted into law on February 23, 1995, and made operational a year later with the appointment of a Chairman and Administrator and the members of the Board by former President Fidel V. Ramos.

Administration

The Ecozone is governed by the Board of Directors of the Zamboanga City Special Economic Zone Authority, a corporate body to handle the management and operation of the ecozone.

Focus areas
The current investments and public-private partnership schemes are centred around four (4) focus areas:

The New Port (San Ramon Newport)

The site of the new port in Sitio San Ramon  extends three (3) kilometers. It will be developed in multiple phases, comprising container terminals that can accommodate general cargo traffic, vehicle imports, livestock imports, bulk grain imports, offshore support vessels, coast guard vessels and marine support vessels.

Halal Food Manufacturing Centre (Asian Halal Centre)

The one hundred (100) hectares food processing complex is capable of housing prospective manufacturers of halal food and food grade products that are targeted to garner 30% market share of the USD15.9 billion in potential business. The Zamboecozone currently has signed a Memorandum of Agreement with the National Commission on Muslim Filipinos for the promotion and development of local halal industries.

West Corporate Centre

This consists of low-rise commercial buildings offered as a mixed-use office and commercial zone for prime leases to corporations and locators. Situated in the vibrant west coast of Zamboanga City, this prime office location will serve as the central business district for banks and other financial and industrial operations. Principally built to attract operation hubs for business process outsourcing companies (BPOs) looking for 2nd wave cities to tap the USD 18.4 billion revenues market.

Bio-Security Farms (La Paz Biotech Farms)

The Bio-Tech Farms are designed to house all high-value agro-ventures producing major agriculture products to include coconut, livestock and poultry, and tropical fruits and vegetables. This will complement the Asian Halal Centre to supply raw materials for its specialty items.

List of investors

References

External links
 Official Website

Industrial parks in the Philippines
Buildings and structures in Zamboanga City
Special economic zones
PEZA Special Economic Zones